This is a list of aircraft produced or proposed by Geoffrey de Havilland or designed at the de Havilland Aircraft Company from its founding in 1920 until its purchase by (and integration into) the Hawker Siddeley Group in 1959.

The aircraft are ordered by de Havilland model number; The numbers started with de Havilland's employment at Airco company as chief designer. Although Airco built the planes, their design was owned by de Havilland and when de Havilland started his own company, he continued the numbering. The numbering sequence continued for later designs of de Havilland's aircraft company, even if they were designed by a factory team with little input from de Havilland himself. The DH.89, for example, was the 89th de Havilland design.

The designs DH.121 and DH.125 which were under development when de Havilland lost its separate identity under Hawker Siddeley kept their numbering and were produced as the Hawker Siddeley HS-121 Trident and the Hawker Siddeley HS.125.

The list does not include aircraft designed by de Havilland Canada or de Havilland Australia, founded as de Havilland subsidiaries.

Designs prior to company foundation
These are designs by Geoffrey de Havilland while working for himself or for other manufacturers.

de Havilland Aircraft Company designs

See also
de Havilland Moth

References

Notes

Bibliography
 
 
 
 
 

de Havilland